Heikant is a small village in the municipality of Tilburg, in the Dutch province of North Brabant. It is located about 2 km northeast of the centre of Berkel-Enschot.

Populated places in North Brabant
Tilburg